Mitee-Chaar is a theatre group in Kalyan, Maharashtra, India.

References

Theatres in India
Culture of Maharashtra